Steven Cann (born 20 January 1988) is a South African-born Welsh footballer who plays for Welsh Premier League side Port Talbot Town.

Club career
Having started his career at Derby County, Cann was released in June 2007. After his release by Derby, Cann joined Rotherham United on 31 July 2007, after impressing in a trial. He played his first game for the Millers in a 3-0 FA Cup loss to Aldershot Town. In his next game for the Millers, in the Football League Trophy Northern Semi-Final against Darlington, Cann saved 2 penalties in a 4–2 shoot out win, including saving one with his groin, enabling the Millers to progress to the Northern Final.

Cann was released by Rotherham at the end of the 2008–09 season, joining Welsh Premier League side Aberystwyth Town, making his debut in a 4–0 win over Caersws on the opening day of the season. Having previously been with the club on a non-contract basis, Cann signed a permanent contract with Aberystwyth on 4 December 2009. Manager Alan Morgan praised Cann's form stating: "Steve, in my eyes, is the best goalkeeper in the Welsh Premier." In his first year with the club, Cann made 29 league appearances before an injury ruled him out for the final month of the season.

Following a two-season spell with Carmarthen Town, Cann joined fellow Welsh Premier League outfit Port Talbot Town.

International career
Cann has represented Wales Under 19 and was called to the under 19 squad for the 2006 Milk Cup. He is eligible to play for three countries Wales, South Africa and England.

On 8 September 2009, Cann made his debut for the Wales semi-professional side as a substitute during a 2–1 defeat to Poland.

References

External links

1988 births
Living people
Place of birth missing (living people)
Welsh footballers
Wales youth international footballers
Association football goalkeepers
Derby County F.C. players
Rotherham United F.C. players
Aberystwyth Town F.C. players
Carmarthen Town A.F.C. players
Port Talbot Town F.C. players
English Football League players
Cymru Premier players
White South African people
South African soccer players
South African emigrants to the United Kingdom